Linda testacea is a species of beetle in the family Cerambycidae. It was described by Saunders in 1839. It is known from India, China, Myanmar, Bangladesh, Nepal, and Laos.

References

testacea
Beetles described in 1839